Pro Motorsport is an auto racing team based in Italy.

History

International Formula Master
Pro Motorsport raced in International Formula Master from its inaugural season in 2005 up until the end of the 2008 season.

In 2005, with the series known as the 3000 Pro Series, Pro Motorsport performed solidly and their driver Max Busnelli was eventually crowned joint-champion with Norbert Siedler, both on 49 points and with identical race finishing positions. Busnelli collected two wins for the team on his way to the drivers' title. The team finished third in the overall standings.

The renamed 2006 F3000 International Masters season saw Pro Motorsport finish second in the teams' standings and they collected another win, from driver Davide di Benedetto. In 2007, they won the last race of the season to end up fourth in the team's championship - the race was won by Marcello Puglisi.

They haven't returned since the 2008 International Formula Master season in which they won another race to make a total of five in their four years in the series. Marcello Puglisi won again but the team only finished in eleventh place overall having only raced in select events throughout the season.

References

External links
Official Website

Italian auto racing teams
International Formula Masters teams
Auto racing teams established in 2002